Ludivine is a feminine given name. Notable women with the given name include:

Ludivine Dedonder, Belgian politician
Ludivine Diguelman, French footballer
Ludivine Furnon, French artistic gymnast
Ludivine Henrion, Belgian road bicycle racer
Ludivine Kreutz, French professional golfer
Ludivine Lasnier (born 1985), French kickboxer 
Ludivine Sagnier, French actress

Feminine given names